Caspian race is a term used in racial anthropology by some authors to describe a sub-race of the greater Caucasian race.
The term is used by M. G. Abdushelishvili (1979) as constituting a branch of the Mediterranean race or Irano-Afghan race. In Soviet-era anthropology, the term was used to include Tats and Azerbaijanis.

The phenotype has been said to be prevalent among the Azerbaijanis, Kumyks and Tsakhurs.
Genrietta Leonidovna Khit states that as a form of racial admixture the Caspian subtype is represented among Turkmens and Talyshs.

See also 
Alpine race
Mediterranean race
Nordic race

Notes 

Biological anthropology
Historical definitions of race
Pseudoscience